Pandisus is a genus of jumping spiders that was first described by Eugène Louis Simon in 1900.

Species
 it contains six species, endemic to Madagascar, except for one, which is found only in India:
Pandisus decorus Wanless, 1980 – Madagascar
Pandisus indicus Prószyński, 1992 – India
Pandisus modestus (Peckham, Peckham & Wheeler, 1889) – Madagascar
Pandisus parvulus Wanless, 1980 – Madagascar
Pandisus sarae Wanless, 1980 – Madagascar
Pandisus scalaris Simon, 1900 (type) – Madagascar

References

Salticidae genera
Salticidae
Spiders of the Indian subcontinent
Spiders of Madagascar